The Poincaré Seminars, named for the mathematician and theoretical physicist Henri Poincaré, were founded in 2001. They are nicknamed Bourbaphy for their inspiration by the Bourbaki Seminars.

The goal of this seminar is to provide information on topics of current interest in physics. Its way of working is directly inspired by the Bourbaki Seminar in mathematics. A series of pedagogical talks aims at explaining a topic of current interest both from a theoretical and an experimental point of view, possibly complemented by a historical introduction. A booklet with the contributions of the speakers is distributed on the day of the seminar. The seminar aims at a general audience of mathematicians and physicists and does not require any specialized knowledge.

Publications

External links
 English pages about Bourbaphy at the Centre National de la Recherche Scientifique

Physics conferences